The Indian River School District (IRSD) is a public school district in Sussex County, Delaware in the United States. The district is based in Selbyville and serves the southeastern portion of Sussex County.

History
It was established in 1969 due to school districts merging. Smaller districts those of Selbyville, Frankford, Dagsboro, Lord Baltimore, Millsboro, and Georgetown.

The school district is one of the largest by land area in the State of Delaware.

Geography
The Indian River School District serves the southeastern portion of Sussex County, Delaware. Communities served by the district include: Selbyville, Bethany Beach, Dagsboro, Fenwick Island, Frankford, Georgetown, Long Neck, Millsboro, Millville, Ocean View, and South Bethany.

School board
James Hudson, President 	
Rodney Layfield, Vice President
Charles Bireley
James Fritz
Leolga Wright
W. Scott Collins
Donald Hattier
Susan Bunting, Executive Secretary
Jerry Peden
Douglas Hudson
Heather Statler, Dr.

Schools
High schools
Indian River High School
Sussex Central High School

Middle schools
Georgetown Middle School
Millsboro Middle School
Selbyville Middle School

Elementary schools
Clayton (John M.) Elementary School
East Millsboro Elementary School
Georgetown Elementary School
Long Neck Elementary School
Lord Baltimore Elementary School
North Georgetown Elementary School
Showell (Phillip C.) Elementary School

Other schools
Early Learning Center
Ennis (Howard T.) School (special education up to 21 years old)
Southern Delaware School of the Arts

See also
List of school districts in Delaware

References

School districts in Sussex County, Delaware
Selbyville, Delaware